Unionville is an unincorporated community in Worcester County, Maryland, United States.

References

Unincorporated communities in Worcester County, Maryland
Unincorporated communities in Maryland